Form 10-12B is a U.S. SEC filing used to register securities pursuant to Section 12(b) of the Securities Exchange Act of 1934 in the United States.

Form uses 

This form is one of the most useful of the security registration forms because it relates to securities created as a result of a spin-off.

Reading the form 

There are three major portions of the 10-12B form:

 Letter to Shareholders from Parent Company - This provides a history of the parent company, their reason for the spin-off, and other relevant information.
 Information Statement - This section contains all the information investors need to know. Occasionally, portions of this section will be left blank and amended (with 10-12B/A filings) at a later time.
 Financial Information - This section contains all the financial information, including pro-forma statements. These statements show what the financials would look like if the spun off division were its own company in the past.

References

External links 

SEC filings